Mary Foster may refer to:

 Mary Foster (biochemist) (1865–1960), American biochemist
 Mary LeCron Foster (1914–2001), American anthropological linguist
 Mary Robinson Foster (1844–1930), Hawaiian philanthropist
 Mary Parke McFerson Foster, president general of the Daughters of the American Revolution